Monday Night NFL Countdown (also known as NFL Countdown for non Monday Broadcasts) (officially Monday Night Countdown presented by Subway) is an American pregame television program that is broadcast on ESPN, preceding Monday Night Football. When it debuted in 1993 as NFL Prime Monday, and Monday Night Football was airing on ABC, the pregame show was one of the first cross-pollinations between ESPN and ABC Sports, each of which operated largely under separate management at the time. The show was renamed Monday Night Countdown in 1998, and Monday Night Football moved from ABC to ESPN in 2006. The current sponsor is Subway, starting with the 2020 season. Previous sponsors of the show include UPS, Applebee's, Call of Duty, and Courtyard by Marriott

History

Monday Night Football on ABC era
The show was initially hosted by Mike Tirico along with analysts Joe Theismann, Craig James, Phil Simms and Ron Jaworski. Mike Ditka also discussed certain topics and Chris Mortensen brought news and rumors from around the league. John Clayton was also a regular guest on the show. Former presenters include Mike Tirico, Bill Parcells, Michael Irvin, and Sterling Sharpe. During the 2005 season, it enjoyed its best ratings ever and was the highest-rated studio sports show on cable television. On occasion, the crew appeared on-site at the game, but for the most part the show was aired from the studios in Bristol, Connecticut.

ESPN Monday Night Football

2006
In 2006, the show began appearing at the Monday Night Football site live as the game moved to ESPN from ABC. Stuart Scott moved to host of NFL Primetime which precedes Monday Night Countdown and Chris Berman moved from NFL Primetime to Monday Night Countdown and was joined by returning analysts Tom Jackson and Michael Irvin along with new analyst from Sunday NFL Countdown Steve Young. Ron Jaworski also contributed to the show along with Chris Mortensen, Ed Werder and Sal Paolantonio. Also, in 2006 Monday Night Countdown introduced a new logo and new graphics as part of The Syndicate's new NFL package for ESPN. In the same fashion as all ESPN NFL studio shows, Monday Night Countdown adopted ABC's alternate football musical theme, though presented as a shuffle.

2007
Beginning with the 2007, the show cutback its onsite presence by having its main anchor team at ESPN studio's in Bristol, but still kept a set at the actual game site.

2008
The Bristol team was Berman, Jackson, Mortensen, Mike Ditka, Keyshawn Johnson, and Cris Carter. The on-site team is Scott, Young, and Emmitt Smith.

2009-2012
The Bristol team was Berman, Jackson, Mortensen, Ditka, Johnson, and Carter. The on-site team was Scott, Young, and Matt Millen (later Trent Dilfer) in the third spot.

On September 17, 2012, Monday Night Countdown moved up to the 6:30 ET timeslot and expanded to 2 hours.  As a result, SportsCenter Monday Kickoff had its runtime cut in half, from 60 minutes to 30 minutes only.  Additionally, Monday Night Countdown debuted a new program logo that closely resembles that of Monday Night Football and a new graphics scheme package matching that of Monday Night Football.  Also, Monday Night Countdown began using MNF's "Heavy Action" theme music as this program's own theme music.

2013
Ray Lewis is added to the on-site team after his retirement from the NFL in 2012.

On December 23, 2013, the final scheduled Monday Night Football broadcast of that season, Chris Berman was at Candlestick Park in San Francisco covering the 49ers' final home game in that stadium, while Stuart Scott was at ESPN's Bristol studios.  The 49ers defeated the Atlanta Falcons, 34–24, in the MNF season finale.  That game was also the 36th and final Monday Night Football game — and the last NFL game — ever played at Candlestick Park.

2014
On September 8, 2014, Monday Night Countdown moved to a brand-new set inside Digital Center 2 of ESPN's Bristol studios, which shares the same set as Sunday NFL Countdown and NFL Primetime.  However, the Monday Night Football graphics package is still used, but the rundown graphic was changed to match the one used on SportsCenter.  1 week later (September 15, 2014), Monday Night Countdown moved up to the 6:00 p.m. ET timeslot, which resulted in SportsCenter Monday Kickoff not returning for the 2014 season and moving the 6:00 p.m. ET edition of SportsCenter to ESPN2 on Mondays during the NFL season.

2015
Suzy Kolber, who substituted for the then-ailing Stuart Scott during most of the 2014 season, took over Scott's role permanently as an on-site host.  She was previously a sideline reporter for Monday Night Football from 2006 to 2010.  Additionally, Monday Night Countdown debuted a new logo resembling its other NFL-themed studio-show properties, along with a new graphics package that is also used for MNF.

2016
With the exception of Chris Berman (who remained in the Bristol studio), the entire Monday Night Countdown crew were moved to the Monday Night Football game site, joining on-site host Suzy Kolber.  Meanwhile, Berman was joined in the Bristol studio each week by analysts who work or had previously worked at ESPN.  However, Berman and the Monday Night Countdown crew did the show on November 21 from Estadio Azteca in Mexico City for the game between the Oakland Raiders and Houston Texans, and December 12 from Gillette Stadium in Foxborough, Massachusetts.  This was also Berman's final season as a host for ESPN's NFL-themed studio shows.

2017
Suzy Kolber was named host of Monday Night Countdown on March 23, 2017.  She replaced Chris Berman, who departed after 30 seasons of hosting NFL-themed studio shows, though he still appeared in occasional segments.  In addition to her pregame duties, Kolber now hosts all halftime and post-game shows, normally from the game site; however, the October 9, 2017, November 27, 2017, and December 25, 2017, shows all originated from ESPN's Bristol studio.  The Christmas Day episode, which only ran for 45 minutes, did not have Woodson or Young; Rex Ryan did the show.

2019
Woodson left ESPN for Fox, and Hasselbeck left Countdown to take over as a full-time co-analyst role for ESPN's Thursday Night College Football games. Therefore, the lineup was Suzy Kolber, Adam Schefter, Randy Moss, Steve Young, and Louis Riddick. The show got a new graphics package. The October 28 show originated from Bristol instead of Pittsburgh, probably because the show had been there earlier in the season.

2020
Monday Night Countdown, along with most of ESPN's NFL-themed studio shows, moved to the network's South Street Seaport studios in New York City for the 2020 season.  With the exception of Louis Riddick, who switched roles with Booger McFarland & moved to the Monday Night Football broadcast booth (the latter of whom took over Riddick's previous role of studio analyst), the lineup remained the same from the previous season.

2021
After being at the network's New York City facilities due to the COVID-19 pandemic the previous year, Monday Night Countdown returned to the game site for the first time in two seasons.  Kolber, McFarland, Moss and Young all returned from the previous season. The show originated from New York instead of Baltimore October 11 and Washington November 29. Young didn't do the show October 18; Alex Smith did the show for the first time.

2022
Prior to the start of the season, Berry left for NBC Sunday Night Football and a fantasy football show on Peacock. Larry Fitzgerald and Robert Griffin III made their debuts. Randy Moss left to do Sunday NFL Countdown only. Alex Smith made more appearances, but not every week. The October 31 and December 26, 2022 and January 2, 2023, shows originated from New York instead of Cleveland, Indianapolis and Cincinnati, respectively. On those shows, Young was not at the former, and in a remote location on the latter two.  The January 2 show ran on ESPN2 and ran for a hour and 15 minutes; Rex Ryan substituted for Griffin.

Personalities
This is a list of personalities that currently or formerly appeared on Monday Night Countdown.

Current

Main Panelists
Suzy Kolber: (Host, 2015–present)
Steve Young: (Analyst, 2006–present)
Robert Griffin III: (Analyst, 2022–present)
Booger McFarland: (Analyst, 2020–present)
Alex Smith: (Substitute analyst, 2021–present)
Larry Fitzgerald: (Substitute analyst, 2022–present)

Contributors
Sal Paolantonio: (Contributor, 2006–present)
Michelle Beisner-Buck: (Contributor, 2016–present)
Lisa Salters: (Sideline reporter, 2012–present)

NFL Insiders
Chris Mortensen: (1993–present)
Adam Schefter: (2009–present)

Former

Hosts 
 Mike Tirico: (1993–2001)
 Stuart Scott: (2002–2005, 2007–2014)
 Chris Berman: (2006–2016)

Analysts 
 Joe Theismann: (1993–1997)
 Craig James: (1993–199?)
 Phil Simms: (1994)
 Sterling Sharpe: (1995–2002)
 Ron Jaworski: (199?–2005)
 Michael Irvin: (2003–2006)
 Tom Jackson: (2006–2015)
 Keyshawn Johnson: (2007–2015)
 Bill Parcells: (2007)
 Emmitt Smith: (2007–2008)
 Mike Ditka: (2008–2015)
 Cris Carter: (2008–2015)
 Matt Millen: (2009–2010)
 Trent Dilfer: (2011–2016)
 Ray Lewis: (2013–2015)
 Matt Hasselbeck: (2016–2018)
 Charles Woodson: (2016–2018)
 Louis Riddick: (2019)
 Randy Moss: (2016–2021)

Contributors 
 Dan Le Batard 1999- 2020
 Mike Ditka: (2004–2005; 2007)
 Michele Tafoya: (2006–2011)
 Ed Werder: (2006–2016)
 Rick Reilly: (2008–2015)
 Louis Riddick: (2017–2018)

Segments

Current
Playmaking Made Easy: The presenters of the program are seen outside giving a full demonstration of how to perform certain moves.
Sunday Snapshot: Introduced on September 25, 2017. Highlights of Sunday's games are shown, with a still represented by a click of a camera. Originally, the Sunday Snapshot consisted of a theme (e.g., upsets) but now is about a player's performance from the previous day's game.
Game Balls: Introduced on October 2, 2017. Kolber and the other analysts give out game balls to those who had an outstanding performance over the weekend. It is similar to the Game Balls that Berman and Tom Jackson gave out on NFL Primetime and other shows.
C'Mon Man!: Introduced on October 27, 2008. During the show, they will each describe a play or series of plays that made them scratch their heads and say, "C'Mon Man!".  They range from plays on the field to actions by fans and other people present at the game.  This includes plays from games in the NFL, college and high school football, and the Canadian Football League as well as, occasionally, from other sports.  "C'Mon Man!", which is similar to the weekly "Not Top Plays" segment on SportsCenter, is sponsored by GEICO.
You Got Mossed!: Introduced in 2016, this segment features highlights of catches by wide receivers in high school football, the CFL, college football, the NFL and even MLB, the NBA and Ultimate Frisbee, while the defenders are being described as getting "mossed" (hence the term named after ESPN NFL analyst & former NFL wide receiver Randy Moss).
Boomer's Best: A new segment introduced in 2017, where Chris Berman highlights historic moments from the history of Monday Night Football. For the NFL's 100th season in 2019, the format was changed to a countdown of the top 50 plays in NFL history. For the 2020 and 2021 seasons, it was changed to a countdown of the top plays of the weekend. By the fourth week of the 2021 season, the name was changed to "Boomer's Best" (it had been called "Boomer's Vault".) 
Hometown Heroes: Introduced in 2018, it features a player from the night's game helping out in his team's community.

Former
In the Pocket: Former quarterback Steve Young analyzed the performances the league's quarterbacks for Thursday and Sunday games.
Field Pass: Players were shown warming up for the game. Beginning with the November 12, 2018 episode the "Field Pass" name was not being used, but they were still showing player warmups. For several years, it was presented by Dunkin' Donuts.
Teams at 20: An all-day segment, including on SportsCenter, where various facets of each of the Monday night teams were reviewed.
Sunday Drive: Ron Jaworski analyzed a key drive from the previous day's action, from start to finish.
The Mort Report: Chris Mortensen broke down trade rumors, coaching changes and injuries.
Playmakers: Michael Irvin reviewed the players who made the biggest difference in Sunday's games.
Jacked Up: At the end of the show Tom Jackson counted down the top five biggest hits of the week. In 2006, the format went to 6, and 6 to 4 were done on the show, and 3 to 1 were done at halftime. Only hits that did not result in a penalty or injury were featured in this segment. Discontinued at the start of the 2008 season due to the growing issue of glorifying 'big hits' causing concussions in the game.
Dilfer's Dimes: Trent Dilfer shows the best passes from the week's action from the NFL and college football. The segment was previously on SportsCenter Sunday nights before it moved to Monday Night Countdown in 2016. Dilfer was among the employees laid off by ESPN in late April 2017, so it can be surmised the segment has been discontinued.
Sorry Bro!: a segment similar to "C'mon Man!" where plays from the previous day were shown, and Kolber and the analysts would end his/her segment by saying "Sorry Bro!" It only aired once, on September 21, 2015.
Chalk Talk: Jon Gruden interviewed a player or coach from that night's game. It was discontinued after Gruden returned to coaching the Raiders. It was sponsored by Corona, Burger King, Dick's Sporting Goods and Nationwide Insurance.

See also
NFL Insiders
NFL Live
NFL Matchup

Resources
Press Release: ESPN'S 2006 NFL LINEUP SURROUNDS MONDAY NIGHT FOOTBALL WITH 188 YEARS OF GRIDIRON EXPERIENCE

References

External links
Official show page

ESPN original programming
1993 American television series debuts
2000s American television series
2010s American television series
Countdown
National Football League pregame television series